Andrick Cora Jackson (born November 6, 1978), aka Corey Jackson, is a former American football player who was a defensive lineman in the National Football League (NFL) from 2003 to 2007.  Jackson played for the Cleveland Browns and the Denver Broncos. Jackson officially retired from the NFL in 2008. After retiring from the NFL, Jackson became a professional speaker and was featured on several television networks, newspapers, and magazines. Jackson is currently the CEO of Qwerkz, a social networking platform and database that allows athletes to form professional networks and find business opportunities.

Early life 

On November 6, 1978, Andrick Cora Jackson was born in Camden, South Carolina to Andrew and Juanita Jackson. He attended North Central High School in Kershaw, South Carolina where he played basketball and ran track. In 1997, Jackson received an All Area MVP Award in basketball for the 1996-1997 basketball season. He was also named to the all-conference and all-defensive team.

College career (1998 - 2003) 

In 1998, at the age of 19, Jackson quit his job at Walmart and bought a one-way Greyhound bus ticket to Ranger, Texas. He attended Ranger College from 1998 to 2000 and received an associate degree. While at Ranger College, Jackson played basketball under head coach Todd Neighbors, where he averaged 16.5 points, 11.0 rebounds, 2.0 assists and 2.0 blocked shots per game.  During the 1999-2000 basketball season, his team posted a 17-13 record.

After graduating from Ranger College in 2000, Jackson earned a basketball scholarship to the University of Nevada where he received a degree in speech communications. While at the University of Nevada, Jackson was voted team captain, finished sixth in the nation in rebounding, and averaged 9.9 points and 11.1 rebounds per game. Additionally, he was on the WAC all-defensive team and earned the Alpha Male of the Year Award.

NFL career (2003 - 2008) 
In 2003, after deciding against playing professional basketball overseas, Jackson returned to the University of Nevada to continue his studies and was offered an opportunity to play football by the school's head football coach. Jackson played only 12 plays of college football and posted stats of 1 blocked field goal, 1 pass break up, and 1 tackle. 

In 2003, Jackson signed with the Cleveland Browns as a rookie free agent and participated on the practice squad. In 2004, Jackson signed a two-year contract with the Cleveland Browns and was added to the active roster, appearing in one game that season. During the 2004 season, Jackson played in NFL Europe, where he won Defensive MVP of the League. The Cleveland Browns released Jackson in 2005. But, shortly thereafter, he signed a contract with the Denver Broncos where he participated on the Broncos' practice squad. In 2006, he signed a two-year contract with the Denver Broncos. In September 2006, Jackson became injured and eventually was released by the Broncos. Jackson officially retired from the NFL in 2008.

Later career (2008 - 2016) 

Prior to his official retirement from the NFL in 2008, Jackson formed his own company, Corey Jackson Speaks, which focused on motivational speaking. Jackson provides free daily inspirational messages on social media sites such as Facebook, LinkedIn, YouTube and Twitter. Corey also co-founded Stone Lion, a real estate investment trust.

Qwerkz (2017 - present) 
In 2017, Jackson launched Qwerkz, social networking platform and database which aims to help professional athletes and former athletes to develop professional relationships and launch business enterprises. Jackson compared the platform to LinkedIn in a 2017 interview with HuffPost. Jackson found that it was often difficult for young athletes to adapt to new careers after their athletic careers were over, and that many lacked the resumes and professional connections to be successful entrepreneurs. 

Qwerkz was intended to help athletes build 'social capital' and connect with companies. Qwerkz translates athletes' experiences in sports into practical skills sets that help them to become more qualified candidates and connect with companies. The Qwerkz app allows athletes to register with the site and begin networking with businesses and enterprises. Athletes can show off their entrepreneurial plans and accomplishments, and can collaborate with each other on personal projects. The app also allows fans to interact with their favorite athletes, and give feedback on their ideas and enterprises.

In 2019 Qwerkz evolved into an executive recruiting firm specifically for pro athletes. Qwerkz takes athletes' experiences and skills and translates the into a traditional format. Jackson stated that he believes this process will give companies a better understanding of the athletes' value and how they can give their company an advantage in the market.

References

External links
 
Qwerkz official website

Living people
1978 births
People from Camden, South Carolina
Cleveland Browns players
Denver Broncos players
Nevada Wolf Pack football players
Nevada Wolf Pack men's basketball players
American men's basketball players